Ancient Chinese Whorehouse is a 1994 Hong Kong sex comedy film directed by Kai Ming Lai and written by Man Fai Ng, starring Yvonne Yung, Kent Cheng, Kingdom Yuen, Elvis Tsui, Cheng Xueyan, and Liu Dizhi. The film premiered in Hong Kong on 15 September 1994.

Plot
A poor girl named A Qing was sold into the brothel Changle Fang during Tang Dynasty. Brother Gang is an inventor, he is good at inventing sex toys and he fells in love with Wu Gu'niang secretly. While A Qing sleep with the visitor, she drank ecstasy and has sex with A Yi. Later, they fell in love. Finally, A Qing married A Yi and left the brothel.

Cast
 Yvonne Yung as Wu Gu'niang, the brothel owner.
 Kent Cheng as Brother Gang, the inventor in the brothel.
 Kingdom Yuen as Sister Zhu, a prostitute in the brothel.
 Elvis Tsui as the Royal Highness, a man with a warm temperament who was killed by Wu Gu'niang.
 Cheng Xueyan as A Qing, a poor girl who was sold into the brothel.
 Liu Dizhi as A Yi, Brother Gang's student, he fells in love with A Qing.

Release
The film was released in Hong Kong on 15 September 1994 and grossed a total of $2,481,978.00 in Hong Kong.

The film received critical acclaim.

References

External links

Films set in the Tang dynasty
Hong Kong sex comedy films
1990s sex comedy films
1994 comedy films
1994 films
1990s Hong Kong films